The quartier du Val-de-Grâce is the 19th administrative district or 'quartier' of Paris, located in the 5th arrondissement of the city. Its borders are boulevard de Port-Royal to the south, boulevard Saint-Michel to the west, rue Soufflot, rue des Fossés-Saint-Jacques and rue de l'Estrapade to the north and rue Mouffetard and rue Pascal to the east.

It is named for the Val-de-Grâce military hospital and former abbey on boulevard de Port-Royal.

Transport 

 RER B stations:
 Luxembourg station.
 Port-Royal station.

Notable sites and attractions 

 Val-de-Grâce hospital and its church.
 Numerous prestigious institutions of higher education and research:
 École normale supérieure on Rue d'Ulm.
 Institut national agronomique on Rue Claude-Bernard.
 Institut Curie on Rue d'Ulm and Rue Lhomond.
 École supérieure de physique et de chimie industrielles de la ville de Paris on Rue Vauquelin.
 École nationale supérieure de chimie de Paris on Rue Pierre-et-Marie-Curie.
 École nationale supérieure des arts décoratifs on Rue d'Ulm.
 Institut national des jeunes sourds on Rue Saint-Jacques.
 Institut de géographie on Rue Saint-Jacques.
 Institut océanographique de Paris on Rue Saint-Jacques.
 The Schola Cantorum on Rue Saint-Jacques.
 Places of worship:
 Church of the Val-de-Grâce on Rue Saint-Jacques.
 Church of Saint-Jacques du Haut-Pas on Rue Saint-Jacques.
 Lutheran church of Saint-Marcel on Rue Pierre-Nicole.

References

Val-de-Grace
5th arrondissement of Paris